Antsampanana  is a village in Atsinanana Region, Madagascar. It belongs to the municipality of Mahatsara. It is located along Route Nationale (RN) 2, at the northern terminus of RN 11 (which heads south to Vatomandry).  Its market area is a common stopping point for trips.

References

Populated places in Atsinanana